Hurn is a village and civil parish in the historic county of Hampshire and the ceremonial county of Dorset, England. In 2001, the village had a population of 468.

Hurn is the location of Bournemouth Airport (originally RAF Station Hurn), an important airfield dating to the Second World War. The village was served by Hurn railway station from 1863 to 1935, and the station building and platform are extant. They are now used as the Avon Causeway Hotel.

Hurn is listed in the Domesday Book as "Herne" (in the Egheiete Hundred of Hantescire), and was later known in the 13th century as Hyrne and in the 14th century as Hurne. The name is derived from the old English "hyrne", which means a disused part of a field or the land sectioned by an oxbow lake.

Hurn Court is a Grade II listed manor house, formerly home to the Earls of Malmesbury.

Politics 
Hurn is part of the Christchurch parliamentary constituency for elections to the House of Commons. It is currently represented by Conservative MP Christopher Chope.

References

External links

Civil parishes in Dorset
Villages in Dorset
Areas of Christchurch, Dorset
Conservation areas in Dorset